Jun-seong Kim (also credited as Jun Sung Kim, Jun Kim or Brian Kim; born October 4, 1975) is a Hong Kong-born actor of Korean . He is perhaps best known for his role as Mike Juhn in the 2007 crime film West 32nd (2007), directed by Michael Kang.

Biography
Jun-seong Kim grew up in Hong Kong, and has spent time in the United States; he is fluent in English, Korean, Mandarin and Cantonese. He majored in Philosophy and Economics while at Wake Forest University in North Carolina, and worked as a stockbroker before becoming an actor. An early experience that turned him on to a career in acting was performing in the musical The Rocky Horror Show in Korea in 2001. In addition to his American debut in the 2007 film West 32nd, Kim starred as FBI agent Henry Joh in Forgotten (2009), a short film involving human trafficking directed by Reuel Kim. He has also appeared in a number of Korean movies and television series, among them Late Autumn (2010), The Scam (2009), Love Exposure (2007), and Lobbyist (2007).

Filmography

Films
Blind Devotion (short film, 2015) – Louie
No Tears for the Dead (2014)
Innocent Blood (2013) – James Park
How to Use Guys with Secret Tips (2013) – Oh Ji-hoon
Rice on White (2012)
Mandevilla (short film, 2012) – John Kim
Starlight Inn (short film, 2010) – John Kim
The Grey Coat (short film, 2010) – Dea Eun
Late Autumn (2010) – Wang Jing
Hello (short film, 2010) – Jun Park
Forgotten  (short film, 2009) – Henry Joh
The Scam (2009) – Brian Choi
Hellcats (2008) – Young-mi's nail artist (cameo)
West 32nd (2007) – Mike Juhn
Love Exposure (2007) – Kwon Young-hoo
Blossom Again (2005)
Possible Changes (2005)
Mr. Handy (2004)
The Wolf Returns (2004)

Television series
Padam Padam (jTBC, 2011) – Chan-gul
Lobbyist (SBS, 2007) – Michael
Fly High (SBS, 2007) – Park Kang-woo
That Woman (SBS, 2005) – Goo Do-yeon
Fashion 70's (SBS, 2005) – soldier
Wives on Strike (SBS, 2004) – rich playboy
Detectives (SBS, 2003)
South of the Sun (SBS, 2003) – Jung Yun-soo

Theater
Happy Together – 칼이수마 Story
The Road to Jerusalem
The Rocky Horror Show (2001)

References

External links

Living people
American male actors of Korean descent
South Korean male film actors
South Korean male television actors
South Korean expatriates in Hong Kong
1975 births